Kapuskasing  is a town on the Kapuskasing River in the Cochrane District of Northern Ontario, Canada, approximately  east of Hearst and  northwest of Timmins. The town was known as MacPherson until 1917, when the name was changed so as not to conflict with another railway stop in Manitoba.

Etymology 
The town of Kapuskasing (pronounced ka-pus-KAY-sing) gets its name from the Kapuskasing River, which was named long before the existence of the town. Kapuskasing is a word of Cree origin meaning "bend in the river".

The first reported survey of the district in which Kapuskasing lies was carried out in 1875 by Dr. Robert Bell of the Geological Survey of Canada. He referred to the Kapuskasing River as the "Kai-bush-ka-sing". According to Bell's information, the Kapuskasing River derived its name from the lake at its head.

In 1900, the Bureau of Colonization of the Ontario Department of Agriculture sent parties to survey the region north of the Canadian Pacific Railway between the Quebec border and Lake Nipigon. Their main interest was to seek out and delimit areas for further agricultural settlements that would give Ontario a new farming frontier to offset the attraction of the western prairies.

In 1900, the Department of Crown Lands commissioned a Survey of Exploration of Northern Ontario. Survey parties were sent out to explore, document and report back to the Province on the various resources of water power, timber, etc., that might be available for exploitation. No roads existed, but northern Cree Indians and fur traders had used the local rivers connecting to James Bay for centuries. In the summer of 1900 groups of surveyors traveled the many rivers of this remote area documenting their findings. The results were published by order of the Legislative Assembly of Ontario as "Report of the Survey of Exploration of Northern Ontario 1900". The section of the report detailing the exploration of the Kapuskasing River contains references to the local Cree names for Sturgeon Falls, White Spruce Rapids, Kapuskasing River, and Big Beaver Falls, among others. Surveyors who explored the Kapuskasing River and tributaries in 1900 had local Cree guides familiar with the country who provided the local place names and their meanings to them. In this report the word Kapuskasing is said to mean "Whispering Water".

At the location where the CNR crossed the Kapuskasing River in 1910, there was an island in the centre of the river. Power and storage dams were built at that location in 1923. Prior to the dam construction, the rapids at that location was known as "White Spruce Rapids" and later known simply as "Spruce Falls". The first Spruce Falls Company of 1920 took its name from these rapids.

Geography, climate, and wildlife 

Kapuskasing lies in the heart of the Great Clay Belt. The topography of the region is very flat, dotted with numerous small lakes and muskeg bogs. Also in the heart of Canada's boreal forest, the region is drained by rivers running north to James Bay. The district is heavily forested, mostly by thick stands of black spruce that have commercial value as pulpwood.

Kapuskasing has a humid, continental climate (Koppen Dfb). Kapuskasing has long, cold winters and warm, sometimes humid summers. Spring and autumn are relatively short transitional seasons. Visitors often comment on the deep blue of the sky during clear weather.

Wildlife is abundant. Species such as moose, black bear, lynx and red fox are commonly seen in the area. Lakes and rivers are well populated with walleye, northern pike and yellow perch. Fishing and hunting are very popular recreational activities locally.

History 

Located near the western edge of the Clay Belt of "New Ontario", the town was founded in the early 20th century after the National Transcontinental Railway, forerunner of the Canadian National Railway, was built through the area in 1911. An Ontario Historical Plaque was erected by the province to commemorate the founding of Kapuskasing's role in Ontario's heritage.

An Internment camp was set up at Bunk Houses in Kapuskasing from December 1914 to February 1920.

A scheme to settle veterans of the First World War in this vicinity was unsuccessful. It was not until the start of pulp and paper milling operations in the 1920s that Kapuskasing began to develop as an organized community.

Val Albert

Name taken from that of an early settler and assigned by postal authorities on October 7, 1936, "to correspond with the village known as {Val} Albert" (CPCGN files).  Annexed by Kapuskasing on January 1, 1974.

Spruce Falls 

The Kapuskasing River Pulp and Timber limit, that included  of timber and hydro leases at Sturgeon Falls, White Spruce Rapids (Spruce Falls) and Big Beaver Falls, was awarded to speculators Saphrenous A. Mundy and Elihu Stewart in 1917, and Spruce Falls Pulp and Paper Ltd. was incorporated, but no development took place.

The still unexploited timber limits were sold to Kimberly-Clark in 1920. The new Spruce Falls Company Ltd. began the development of the first pulp mill in Kapuskasing under the direction of F.J. Sensenbrenner, a Vice President of Kimberly Clark Corporation for the next 20 years. The small sulphite mill started up in late 1922 with four 12-ton digesters and a daily output of 75 tons of pulp. Spent liquor was discharged untreated into the Kapuskasing River.

Early development was plagued by major setbacks. Fire destroyed the construction camp and power project at Sturgeon Falls. A year's supply of pulpwood that was boomed up in the river was washed away in the spring flood. A fire at the new mill killed two workers and brought production to a halt.

In 1923, a water storage and hydro electric dam was built by Morrow and Beatty Ltd. of Peterborough at Spruce Falls.

In 1926, the Spruce Falls Power and Paper Company was incorporated under joint ownership of Kimberly-Clark and The New York Times. The new company negotiated two additional hydro power leases to the north on the Mattagami River at Smoky Falls and Devils Rapids. Work to build a 550 ton/day paper mill at Kapuskasing, a 75,000 HP hydro generating station at Smoky Falls and a  railway and power line connecting the two got underway in the spring of 1926. The contractor for the entire project was Morrow and Beatty Ltd. of Peterborough.

Since July 13, 1928, The New York Times has been printed entirely on Spruce Falls paper. The mill has run continuously ever since. The company became known locally as "Uncle Spruce" in affectionate reference to the steady work and benefits provided to this distinct northern community for many decades.

The mill was the focus of the Reesor Siding 1963 Strike, which saw three union workers killed. In 1997 Tembec became the sole owner of the mill which is now known as Tembec — Spruce Falls Operations.

Kapuskasing Inn 

The Kapuskasing Inn was built in 1927-28 by George Roper Gouinlock, son of George Wallace Gouinlock, together with the Civic Centre (built 1928) and the former Sensenbrenner Hospital (built 1929, now Drury Place, a geared-to-income housing complex). They were commissioned by the Spruce Falls Company Ltd. These buildings were all built in an impressive Neo-Tudor style and would form the nucleus of the town. In 1951, the inn hosted Princess Elizabeth and the Duke of Edinburgh on their first visit to Canada.

The landmark inn closed in 2002 and fell in disrepair but was slated for renovation by new investors. On May 22, 2007, youths set fire to the inn. It was damaged beyond repair. The arsonists were not charged as they were below the age of criminal responsibility at the time of the fire. The remains of the inn were demolished in May and June 2008.

Internment camp 

During World War I, the town was the site of one of the largest internment camps in Canada. The camp held over 1,300 German, Austrian, and Turkish prisoners, though the majority were Canadian residents of Ukrainian descent who had emigrated from the provinces of Bukovina and Galicia, their homeland, which at the time were part of the Austro-Hungarian Empire, in the first wave of Ukrainian emigration to Canada prior to 1914. Prisoners were employed in the construction of buildings and clearing of land for a government experimental farm on the west side of the Kapuskasing River. Isolation provided ideal security for the minimum security camp, as the railway was the only access to the remote location. Prisoners who attempted to escape into the bush were turned back by endless muskeg and clouds of mosquitoes or minus-40 degree temperatures in winter. In 1917, most were paroled to help relieve labour shortages. Afterwards, the camp was used briefly for prisoners of war and political radicals until its closure in 1920.

A small cemetery is all that remains of the internment camp near the Kapuskasing Airport where victims of the 1918 influenza epidemic were laid to rest. An Ontario Historical Plaque was erected by the province to commemorate the Kapuskasing Internment Camp's role in Ontario's heritage.

Kapuskasing Soldier Colony 
Governments of the day were mistakenly impressed with the agricultural potential of the Great Clay Belt. A federal government experimental farm had been established on the west side of the river to explore and develop crops and systems for farming the area. Under the Returned Soldiers and Sailors Act of 1917, the Kapuskasing Soldier Colony was established to settle veterans returned from the Great War. Settlers received homesteads, grants, and guaranteed loans and were paid for clearing their own land. However, by 1920 only nine of more than a hundred original settlers remained, and the project was discontinued.

A 1920 Commission of Enquiry into the failed settlement scheme found that the settlers had not been up to the task at hand. The inhospitable climate and geography had won out. One bitter settler testified, "There are 7 months snow, two months rain and the remainder mosquitoes and black flies." Settlers had also counted on the development of a pulp mill at Kapuskasing that would provide a local market for pulp wood.

Radar site 
During World War II, Kapuskasking was one of five Northern Ontario radar bases that were set up to watch for potential attacks on the Soo Locks in Sault Ste. Marie, Michigan. Kapuskasing was the headquarters for the radar bases, which were manned by the United States Army Air Forces. The town may have ceased its importance as a location for a traditional military radar base, but has become a site for the Super Dual Auroral Radar Network that is involved with tracking and measuring ionospheric turbulence.

Demographics 

In 2006, 68% of the population identified French as its first language, 36% identified English as its first language, and 0.02% identified a non-official language as its first language (Cree etc.); 0.02% identified both French and English. The median age of the population was 44.2 years in 2016.

Transportation 

Travellers reach Kapuskasing by car, by Ontario Northland bus or by plane.

The town's pulp and paper mill is served by the Ontario Northland Railway, which took over the trackage serving the mill in 1994. The mill is located just off the original National Transcontinental Railway mainline (NTR) that was later nationalized as part of the Canadian National Railway. The railway line crossed the Kapuskasing River in 1913 and was the main means of transportation accessing the town until the late 1950s and early 1960s when Highway 11 became the main route to the city.

Kapuskasing Airport was once a refueling stop for Trans-Canada Air Lines flights in the days before jet airliners. It no longer has scheduled flights.

Economy 
The former Spruce Falls, now GreenFirst Forest Products, had purchased the site from Rayonier Advanced Materials (RYAM) in 2021. The pulp and paper mill is the town's major employer, soon to be replaced by the Ontario Power Generation's Smoky Falls Dam reconstruction site. A former employer was also the Agrium phosphate mine which shutdown in 2013. General Motors Canada operates the GM Cold Weather Development Centre in Kapuskasing. Agriculture and Agri-Food Canada operates an agricultural experiment station, or Experimental Farm, close to the town. The Experimental Farm closed in 2014.

Politics 
Kapuskasing has a federal representative known as a Member of Parliament, or MP, and a provincial representative known as a Member of Provincial Parliament, or MPP. Carol Hughes of the New Democratic Party is the area's MP and represents the federal riding of Algoma—Manitoulin—Kapuskasing. Guy Bourgouin, member of Ontario's New Democratic Party, is the town's MPP and represents the provincial Mushkegowuk—James Bay riding.

Locally the town is led by Mayor David Plourde. The mayor works with six councillors to complete Kapuskasing's municipal government. Local officials are all elected through universal elections, meaning the town is not divided into wards.

Media 
Kapuskasing's locally originated media include English-language commercial radio station CKAP (branded as Moose FM), French-language community radio station CKGN, and the English-language Kapuskasing Northern Times and bilingual Le/The Weekender community newspapers and the French newspaper L'Horizon. Le Nord, a French newspaper from Hearst, is also available in Kapuskasing. English-language daily newspaper the Timmins Daily Press offers minimal coverage through its regional reporting of the Cochrane District. The community receives its only aerial television coverage from CITO-TV-1 channel 10, a repeater of CTV outlet CITO-TV Timmins.

Radio 
 FM 89.7 - CKGN-FM, Franco-Ontarian community
 FM 90.7 - CBON-FM-24, Ici Radio-Canada Première
 FM 93.7 - CHYK-FM, Francophone hot adult contemporary
 FM 100.9 - CKAP-FM ("Moose FM"), adult contemporary
 FM 105.1 - CBOK-FM, CBC Radio One

Television 
 Channel 10: CITO-TV-1, CTV

Education 

Public

District School Board Ontario North East (DSBONE):
Diamond Jubilee Public School (JK-8)
Kapuskasing District High School (9-12)
Eastview Public School (Closed)
Conseil scolaire de district du Nord-Est de l'Ontario (CSDNE):
École publique Coeur du Nord (M-8)
École secondaire publique l'Écho du Nord (9-12)
Centre d’apprentissage du Nord-Est de l’Ontario (9-12)

Separate

Northeastern Catholic District School Board (NCDSB):
St Patrick School (JK-8, JK-8 French Immersion), established in 1960.
Conseil scolaire catholique de district des Grandes-Rivières (CSCDGR):
École élémentaire Jacques-Cartier (M-6)
École élémentaire Jeanne-Mance (Closed)
École élémentaire André Cary (M-6)
École Sacré-Coeur (Closed)
École secondaire catholique Cité des Jeunes (7-12)

Other

Centre d'éducation Alternative High School (Adult Education)
Collège Boréal à Kapuskasing (Post Secondary)
Université de Hearst à Kapuskasing (Post Secondary)
D'Youville Academy (Religious, Closed)

Public services

Health 
Sensenbrenner Hospital was built in 1927-1929 by the Spruce Falls Pulp & Paper Company for its workers. At the time the hospital was one of northern Ontario's finest. In 1988 the need for a more modern facility arose and the ultra-modern 53 bed complex was built in a different part of the town. Sensenbrenner serves a regional population of 14,000 residents. The hospital provides both in-patient and out-patient care. Clinical services include; emergency services, chronic cardiorespiratory, acute neurology, specialty clinics, general medicine, surgery, anaesthesia, obstetrics, pediatrics, chronic and long-term care, rehabilitation, and other related diagnostic and treatment services. The health care services are assessment, evaluation, screening, treatment programs and direct therapy. In 1995 the hospital built a private clinic wing near the Emergency Room.

EMS services are provided by Sensenbrenner Hospital, which is managed by the Northeastern Ontario Medical Education Corporation (NOMEC).

The Porcupine Health unit serves the town with preventive education, psychiatric services, social services and child social service.

Safety 
The town operates a fire department which is a member of the Fire Marshalls of Ontario, Public Fire Safety Council.

A local branch of the Ontario Provincial Police is located at the site of the old Kapuskasing Inn.

Kapuskasing has Enhanced 911 (E911) service for Fire, Ambulance and Police.

Well-being 

Children's Aid Services, Counselling services, Detox centres, Chiropractitioners, and many other services are offered for those who need it.

Notable people 
 Maxime Boudreault, World's Strongest Man competitor
 James Cameron, motion picture director
 Roy Dupuis, actor
 Paul Lefebvre, politician
 Heather Mallick, author and columnist for the Toronto Star
 Kirk McCaskill, retired pitcher, Major League Baseball
 Shane Peacock, writer
 Kelly Vanderbeek, alpine ski racer

In popular culture 
Kapuskasing is mentioned in the 1994 children’s book Where is Gah-Ning, by Robert Munsch. In the story, a young Chinese-Canadian girl wants to visit Kapuskasing, but her father says no. She tries to go by bicycle and later on roller blades; she finally succeeds in getting there by floating on 300 helium balloons. It is also featured in Tomson Highway's award-winning play Dry Lips Oughta Move to Kapuskasing.
In Season 12 of Degrassi, junior pro hockey player Campbell Saunders comes from Kapuskasing.

The protagonist of Alice Munro's story "Train" (2012), set in the early 1960s, is hopeful when he heads for Kapuskasing: "Work there, sure to be work in a lumbering town".

Canadian singer-songwriter Justin Rutledge has a song called "Kapuskasing Coffee" on his album Valleyheart. The album won the Juno Award for Roots & Traditional Album of the Year - Solo in 2014.

See also 
List of francophone communities in Ontario

References

External links 

 
Single-tier municipalities in Ontario
Populated places established in 1911
Towns in Ontario
1911 establishments in Ontario
Internment camps in Canada